Mengaj is a village situated in the central plains of Albania's Western Lowlands region. It is part of Kavajë municipality and Tirana County.

References

Populated places in Kavajë